Malkoch Peak is the peak rising to 1299 m in the southeast part of Petvar Heights, southeast Sentinel Range in Ellsworth Mountains, Antarctica, and overlooking Carey Glacier to the west and Rutford Ice Stream to the east.

The peak is named after the village of Malkoch in Bulgaria.

Location
US mapping in 1961, updated in 1988.

See also
 Mountains in Antarctica

Notes

External links
 Malkoch Peak. SCAR Composite Antarctic Gazetteer.
 Bulgarian Antarctic Gazetteer. Antarctic Place-names Commission. (details in Bulgarian, basic data in English)
 Antarctic Digital Database (ADD) scale 1:250000 topographic map of Antarctica. Scientific Committee on Antarctic Research (SCAR). Since 1993, regularly updated.

Bulgaria and the Antarctic
Ellsworth Mountains
Mountains of Ellsworth Land